Sir Ratnasothy Saravanamuttu (born October 1886) was a Ceylon Tamil physician, politician and the first Mayor of Colombo.

Early life and family
Saravanamuttu was born in October 1886. He was the son of Vetharniam Saravanamuttu, a physician from Colombo in Ceylon. His mother's family were from Vaddukoddai in northern Ceylon. His paternal grandfather Vetharniam is reputed to be the founder of Chunnakam, a small town in northern Ceylon. Saravanamuttu had five eminent brothers: Nanasothy, Tharmasothy, Paikiasothy, Manicasothy and Saptaranajyoti. He was educated at S. Thomas' College, Mount Lavinia where he won many prizes. He earned a Bachelor of Medicine, Master of Surgery degree (M.B.C.M.) from the University of Madras. He then went to England where he obtained M.R.C.S. and Licentiate of the Royal College of Physicians (L.R.C.P.) qualifications.

Saravanamuttu married Naysum. They had two daughters (Seetha and Chandra) and two sons (Vetharaniam and Ratnakumar).

Career
After returning to Ceylon Saravanamuttu established a dispensary in northern Colombo which soon grew to become a large medical centre.

Saravanamuttu was a member of Colombo Municipal Council from May 1937 to December 1946. He served as Mayor of Colombo from May 1937 to December 1937 and from January 1941 to December 1942. 

He contested the 1931 State Council election as a candidate in Colombo North and was elected to the State Council. However, he was unseated after being found guilty of corrupt practices by an election Judge. His wife, Naysum, was elected in the ensuing by-election, becoming the second female member of the State Council in 1931. 

He was a member of the Liberal League before founding the Independent Labour Party which was later absorbed by the Ceylon National Congress. He played a major role in the relief following the Japanese bombing of Colombo in April 1942. 

Saravanamuttu received a knighthood as a Knight Bachelor for public services in the 1943 New Year Honours.

References

1886 births
Alumni of S. Thomas' College, Mount Lavinia
Ceylonese Knights Bachelor
Mayors of Colombo
Members of the 1st State Council of Ceylon
People from British Ceylon
Sri Lankan Tamil physicians
Sri Lankan Tamil politicians
University of Madras alumni
Year of death missing